Lacconectus is a genus of beetles in the family Dytiscidae, containing the following species:

 Lacconectus andrewesi Guignot, 1952
 Lacconectus arunachal Brancucci, 2006
 Lacconectus balkei Brancucci & Hendrich, 2005
 Lacconectus baolocensis Brancucci, 2004
 Lacconectus basalis Sharp, 1882
 Lacconectus birmanicus Brancucci, 1986
 Lacconectus biswasi Brancucci, 1986
 Lacconectus blandulus Brancucci, 2003
 Lacconectus corayi Brancucci, 1986
 Lacconectus fallaciosus Brancucci, 1986
 Lacconectus formosanus (Kamiya, 1938)
 Lacconectus freyi Guéorguiev, 1968
 Lacconectus fulvescens Motschulsky, 1855
 Lacconectus geiseri Brancucci, 2006
 Lacconectus gusenleitneri Brancucci, 1986
 Lacconectus hainanensis Hendrich, 1998
 Lacconectus heinertzi Brancucci, 1986
 Lacconectus heubergeri Brancucci & Hendrich, 2005
 Lacconectus holzschuhi Brancucci, 1986
 Lacconectus jaechi Brancucci, 2002
 Lacconectus javanicus Brancucci, 1986
 Lacconectus kelantanensis Brancucci & Hendrich, 2005
 Lacconectus khaosokensis Brancucci & Gusich, 2004
 Lacconectus klausnitzeri Brancucci, 2006
 Lacconectus krikkeni Brancucci, 1986
 Lacconectus kubani Brancucci, 2003
 Lacconectus laccophiloides Zimmermann, 1928
 Lacconectus lambai Vazirani, 1977
 Lacconectus loeiensis Brancucci, 1987
 Lacconectus maoyangensis Brancucci, 2003
 Lacconectus menglunensis Brancucci, 2003
 Lacconectus merguiensis Brancucci, 1986
 Lacconectus meyeri Brancucci, 2003
 Lacconectus minutus Brancucci, 1986
 Lacconectus muluensis Brancucci, 1986
 Lacconectus munnarensis Brancucci, 2003
 Lacconectus nepalensis Brancucci, 1989
 Lacconectus nicolasi Brancucci, 1986
 Lacconectus nigrita Brancucci, 2003
 Lacconectus oceanicus Régimbart, 1899
 Lacconectus ovalis Gschwendtner, 1936
 Lacconectus pacholatkoi Brancucci, 2003
 Lacconectus pederzanii Brancucci, 1986
 Lacconectus peguensis Brancucci, 1986
 Lacconectus ponti Brancucci, 1986
 Lacconectus pseudonicolasi Brancucci, 2003
 Lacconectus pseudosimilis Brancucci, 2003
 Lacconectus pulcher Brancucci, 1986
 Lacconectus punctatus Brancucci, 1986
 Lacconectus punctipennis Zimmermann, 1928
 Lacconectus regimbarti Brancucci, 1986
 Lacconectus ritsemae Régimbart, 1883
 Lacconectus rossi Brancucci, 1986
 Lacconectus rutilans Brancucci & Hendrich, 2005
 Lacconectus sabahensis Brancucci, 1986
 Lacconectus satoi Brancucci, 2003
 Lacconectus schawalleri Brancucci & Gusich, 2004
 Lacconectus schillhammeri Brancucci, 2003
 Lacconectus schoedli Brancucci, 2002
 Lacconectus schoenmanni Brancucci, 2002
 Lacconectus scholzi Gschwendtner, 1922
 Lacconectus shaverdoae Brancucci, 2005
 Lacconectus sikkimensis Brancucci, 1989
 Lacconectus similis Brancucci, 1986
 Lacconectus simoni Régimbart, 1893
 Lacconectus spangleri Brancucci, 1986
 Lacconectus splendidus Brancucci, 2003
 Lacconectus stastnyi Brancucci & Hendrich, 2005
 Lacconectus strigulifer Zimmermann, 1928
 Lacconectus tonkinensis Guignot, 1957
 Lacconectus tonkinoides Brancucci, 1986
 Lacconectus valeriae Brancucci, 2004

References

Dytiscidae